Shi Jinqing (Xiao'erjing: , died 1421) was a late 14th century chieftain in Palembang. He was a Muslim whose ancestors were Hui people from Hangzhou. The Ming imperial administration appointed him as chieftain xuanweishi of the Palembang district for his contribution in helping Ming admiral Zheng He defeat the pirate leader Chen Zuyi. Shi Jinqing had already been appointed an official civil servant of the Majapahit kingdom of Java, sent to Palembang to serve as a minister after the Majapahit defeated Srivijaya in the year 1377.

Children
Shi Jinqing had a son Shi Jisun and a daughter Shi Daniang. The daughter was also known as Nyai Gede Pinatih or the Great Lady of Gresik. Both competed for power after their father died in 1421. Zheng He made Shi Jisun the new chieftain or xuanweishi, and the daughter went to Gresik in East Java to preach Islam.

See also
 Liang Daoming
 Battle of Palembang (1407)

Web references
 The 6th overseas Chinese state Nanyang Huaren
 Zheng He and pre-colonial coastal urban development in Southeast Asia.
 Wali Songo pilgrimage
 Sejarah Keturunan Tionghoa di Asia Tenggara yang Tak Dikenal Khalayak Ramai (Malay)

Books
 Admiral Zheng He & Southeast Asia by Suryadinata Leo 

14th-century births
1421 deaths
Chinese Muslims
Indonesian monarchs
Hui people
People from Palembang
Indonesian people of Chinese descent